Kachamachanahalli is a village in the southern state of Karnataka, India. It is located in the Gauribidanur taluk of Chikkaballapura district in Karnataka. It is situated 9 km away from sub-district headquarter Gauribidanur and 45 km away from district headquarter Chikkaballapura

Demographics
According to Census 2011 information the location code or village code of Kachamachanahalli village is 623217. Kachamachanahalli belongs to Gedare gram panchayat.

The total geographical area of village is 563.36 hectares. Kachamachanahalli has a total population of 1,603 peoples with 796 males and 807 females. There are about 372 houses in Kachamachanahalli village. Gauribidanur is nearest town to Kachamachanahalli which is approximately 9 km away.

Economy
People belonging to the Kachamachanahalli village grow very much maize, millet silk, etc. The major occupations of the residents of Kachamachanahalli are sericulture and dairy farming. The dairy cooperative is the largest individual milk supplying cooperative in the state.

Facilities
Kachamachanahalli has below types of facilities.

 Government primary School
 Kachamachanahalli KMF (Karnataka Milk Federation) Dairy
 Government Grocery store

Temples 
 Sri Bommalingeshwara Temple
 Kadri Lakshmi Narasimha Temple

References

External links
 https://chikkaballapur.nic.in/en/

Villages in Chikkaballapur district